Nabil Bechaouch (1970 – 7 October 2020) was a Tunisian footballer.

Biography
Bechaouch played for the Tunisia from 1993 to 1995. He played three matches during the 1996 African Cup of Nations qualification. He died on 7 October 2020 of a heart attack.

Awards
Winner of the CAF Cup in 1998 with CS Sfaxien
Winner of the Tunisian Cup in 1993 with Olympique Béja
Winner of the Tunisian Super Cup in 1995 with Olympique Béja

References

1970 births
2020 deaths
Tunisian footballers
Association football forwards
Tunisia international footballers
Olympique Béja players
CS Sfaxien players
Stade Tunisien players